Lazăr Baroga (11 August 1937 – 14 September 2000) was a Romanian weightlifter. He competed at the 1960 Summer Olympics and the 1964 Summer Olympics.
Baroga created " the Baroga table , it is a document that helps to calculate the ratio on the semi-technical movements in weightlifting

References

1937 births
2000 deaths
Romanian male weightlifters
Olympic weightlifters of Romania
Weightlifters at the 1960 Summer Olympics
Weightlifters at the 1964 Summer Olympics
People from Sibiu County